Zapato 3 is a Venezuelan alternative-rock band, active 1980–2000. It was formed by brothers Álvaro Segura (guitar and choirs) and Carlos Segura (vocalist).

Overview
The original members included Javier Avellaneda (leading voice), Fernando Batoni (bass), Pedro Romero (guitar), and Ernesto Rodríguez (drums).  The final iteration of the group was Carlos Segura (vocals, coros, percussion), Cesar Domínguez (drums), Jaime Verdaguer (fender rhodes), Fernando Batoni (guitar), Jesús Piñango (tambourine), Hilda Carmona, Álvaro Segura (coros), Korg Synthesizer (keyboards, guitar), Manuel Barrios (saxophone), Diego Marquez (mixing), Mauricio Arcas (percussion), and Juan Bautista López (coros, vocals, guitar).

Zapato 3 was founded in early 1984 by a group of students from Santiago de León de Caracas High School, got together to form what would be the first generation of the band; later on, Ingrid Dreissing entered the band to sing lead vocals. Consecutively, Ernesto Rodríguez left the band opening the doors for José Félix Avellaneda to take over drums. Some rumors suggested that Rodríguez had left the band due to a conflict with Dreissing; Dreissing left the band not long after, leaving the band without a lead vocalist.

Finally, Javier Avellaneda decided to take over the role of leading voice of the band. As this is considered somewhat a lengthy beginning in the band it is also obvious the different musical approaches and influences in the group itself. It was a good opportunity to define the genre they would develop themselves into. During the changes of vocal members, it was obvious the punk influence they were under, Eventually, new changes brought Diego Marquez in the drums -who would later on be replaced by Mauricio Cepeda-  at this point they were a more social-oriented- lyrics band. The last significant change in the members of the band before reaching somewhat some members stability was the addition to the group in 1988 of Jorge Ramirez in the guitars later on substituted by Álvaro Segura. Pass this point the group had advertised themselves as a three men band, formed by Fernando Batoni (bass), Javier Avellaneda (voice) and Álvaro Segura (guitars). They decided to function without a steady drummer by using an electronic drum kit. Changes were not over: by late 1988, Javier Avellaneda left the band to have Carlos Segura take over the vocal role and announced the re-incorporation of Diego Márquez in the drums. After this change, it was obvious the band had already lost some of the underground following that had developed in the local scene. Nevertheless this was by far the most stable point of the group in terms of band members.

By 1989, Zapato 3 was on its way to becoming a national musical success. Its style had gone from punk to social-oriented to a much cleaner rock with some sexual lyrics. By then their first album "Amor, Furia y Languidez" (1990) was finally edited which would include tunes that would become some of the most characteristics of the band.

The band became nationally recognized by opening the stage for more rounded groups in several concerts across the country, one of the most remembered was the opening to Soda Stereo in their 1990 Caracas concert during the acclaimed Gira Animal.

Their second album "Bésame y Suicídate" (1991) consolidated Zapato 3, giving them some international projection. By 1994 their new release "Separación" brought new changes with Diego Marquez leaving the band, being substituted by Rafael Cadavieco and also the incorporation of Jaime Verdague in keyboards. Not only they changed band members but also style, becoming more of techno group. This consistency kept on until the release of their 1995 album "Cápsula Para Volar"  but for the following album "Ecos Punzantes del Ayer" (1999) Rafael Cadavieco left the band to give a chance to César Domínguez in the drums. By 1995 the band had already gone all over Venezuela, have had over five concerts in Mexico and by 1997 had played in cities like Miami with bands like Soda Stereo, Aterciopelados, La Unión, and other Venezuelan bands, such as, Desorden Público, Sentimiento Muerto, Caramelos de Cianuro, La Misma Gente, Seguridad Nacional, Aditus, Radio Clip, and Feedback. In 1999 the group's biography was edited, written by Eugenio Miranda by the title: "Zapato 3: Una Fantastica Historia de Amor y Aventura", some of their CDs can be found in websites such as eBay, Amazon.com, CD Now, Universe.com, among others. The band's rupture came after their 1999 release of "Ecos Punzantes del Ayer"

Reunion 
In 2009, a countdown ending on 10/10/10 appeared on the group's official website. In an interview conducted that day, October 10, 2010, on the radio station La Mega 107.3 FM during the Fabricado Acá show, Fernando Batoni, Rafael Cadavieco, Diego Márquez, Álvaro Segura and Jaime Verdaguer announced that they had indeed a tour planned for those dates, but that the proposal that was made in the end did not convince. However, they did not close the possibility of a return. "The conditions just have to be met," said Batoni, who took up the floor for the first time in ten years with the Segura brothers in that interview, the same night that their first meeting would have taken place.

A year later, keyboardist Jaime Verdaguer announced the "unavoidable return" through the band's official Twitter, confirming the negotiations on a national tour for 2012. Days after the announcement made by Jaime Verdaguer through Twitter, on October 16, 2011, in the middle of a live presentation of Solares (band where Carlos and Álvaro Segura and Jaime Verdaguer play) at the Motorland Festival in Valencia, they invited Fernando Batoni took the stage to play some of the greatest hits of Zapato 3 and they promised an official reunion for the following year.

The return to the stage of Zapato 3 took place on March 24, 2012, during the celebration of the 107th anniversary of the Maracay Fairs and after some twelve years of the dissolution. The band was made up of the Segura brothers, Fernando Batoni, Jaime Verdaguer and Diego Márquez. As a result of the great success of the concert, they confirmed through the official page and the Facebook and Twitter accounts the national tour called  The Last Crusade , started on July 13 in Maracaibo.

Discography

Amor, Furia y Languidez (1989)

Grabaciones Clandestinas

"Un Poco Ausente”
"No Puedo Despegar”
"Que Mente”
"Mi Chica”
"Mariposas de Plata”
"Tocarte Tocarte”
"Corrientes Turbulentas”
"Asfalto”
"Náuseas Nocturnas”

Bésame y Suicídate (1991)

Sonográfica/Universal Music

"Déjame Hablar"-(Versión Radio)
"Ahora Estoy Sin ti”
"Tan Cerca De ti”
"Pantaletas Negras”
"Azul Azul”
"Uñas Asesinas”
"Amo Las Estrellas”
"Como Un Fantasma”
"Náuseas Nocturnas"-(En Vivo)
"Déjame Hablar"-(Versión Disco)
"Miss dinastía”
"No Puedo Despegar”

Separación (1993)

Sonográfica/Universal Music

"Donde Estas”
"Obstinado”
"Separación”
"Amor De Hierro”
"Pienso Perdonarte”
"El Amor Es Sangre”
"En Tus Manos”
"Separación"-(psychodance)
"Océano De Tristeza”
"Confessions D' Amour”
"Donde Estas"-(instrumental)

Cápsula para Volar (1995)

Universal Music

"Hermana"
"Muriendo Por ti"
"El Sol y La Luna"
"Maya"
"Cuchillo"
"Alucinado"
"Trance Eterno"
"Vampiro"
"La Razón De Estar Aquí"
"Super Subjetivo"
"Vampiro (Versión Acústica)"
"La Razón De Estar Aquí (Mariachi)(este último oculto dentro de la canción Vampiro (Acústica)"

Ecos Punzantes del Ayer (1999)

Max Music

"Entrada de Bala"
"Dios"
"Permanecer"
"El Amante"
"Plástico"
"Recordándote"
"Tocarte Tocarte"
"Veneno"
"Antonin Artaud"
"Cabaret Avispa"
"Lejano"

Lo Mejor de Zapato 3 (2010)

Sonográfica/Universal Music

"Déjame Hablar"
"Ahora Estoy Sin ti"
"Tan Cerca De ti"
"Pantaletas Negras"
"Azul Azul"
"Uñas Asesinas"
"Amo Las Estrellas"
"Como Un Fantasma"
"Obstinado"
"Separación"
"Pienso Perdonarte"
"El Amor Es Sangre"
"Cuchillo"
"Vampiro"
"La Razón De Estar Aquí"

La ultima cruzada live (2014)

On Records

Separación
Como un fantasma
Ahora estoy sin ti
Muriendo por ti
Hermana
Donde estás?
Amo las estrellas
Obstinado
Amor de hierro
Azul azul
La razón de estar aqui
Artaud
Cuchillo
Entrada de bala
Pantaletas negras

Singles

Amaranto (2017) 

Te Prendo como Mirra (2017)

Elefantes Marinos (2018)

Xanax (2018)

Independiente

References

 Eugenio Miranda, Zapato 3: una fantástica historia de amor y aventura, Fondo Editorial Letras, 1999
 La Ultima Cruzada, la pelicula 2014
 Guarache, Una Idea Muy Obscena. Ediciones B 2015

Venezuelan musical groups
Venezuelan rock music groups
Musical groups established in 1984
Musical groups disestablished in 1999
Musical quartets
1984 establishments in Venezuela